Atriplex rosea is a species of saltbush known by the common names tumbling saltbush, red orach, redscale and tumbling orach (also spelled orache). It is native to Eurasia but it is widespread elsewhere as an introduced species.

This is an annual herb with erect, hairless stems growing up to 1.5 meters, 4.5 feet, in height. The leaves are green to red in color, oval to triangular to lance-shaped, and with edges which are smooth to wavy. Each leaf has three prominent veins and is up to 6 centimeters long and 3 wide. The male and female flowers are borne in clusters or spikelike inflorescences.

References

External links
Jepson Manual Treatment
USDA Plants Profile 
Flora of North America

rosea
Flora of Europe
Flora of Asia
Flora of New Jersey
Taxa named by Carl Linnaeus
Flora without expected TNC conservation status